The Ambassador of the United Kingdom to Albania is the United Kingdom's foremost diplomatic representative in the Republic of Albania.

The Treaty of London (1913) recognised the independence of Albania and the Principality of Albania was established in February 1914, but due to World War I and subsequent repercussions, the UK did not establish diplomatic relations until after the League of Nations recognized Albania in December 1920 and an invasion by Yugoslavia which withdrew in November 1921.

In the early years of the Albanian state, diplomatic missions were located in Durazzo (Durrës) and a British Legation was set up there. The embassy in the capital, Tirana, exists only since diplomatic relations were re-established in 1991 after a long break.

Heads of Mission
Envoy Extraordinary and Minister Plenipotentiary
 1922–1926: Harry Eyres
 1926: William O'Reilly
 1926–1928: William Seeds
 1928–1936: Sir Robert Hodgson
 1936–1939: Sir Andrew Ryan

Sir Andrew Ryan left shortly after the Italian invasion in April 1939. 

 Consul-General
 1939–1940: Laurence Grafftey-Smith
 1939–1991: No relations due to World War II and Corfu Channel incidents.

Ambassador to Italy (also accredited to Albania)
 1991–1992: Sir Stephen Egerton
 1992–1996: Sir Patrick Fairweather

Chargé d'affaires
 1992–1993: John Duncan
 1993–1995: Stephen Nash
 1995–1996: David Slinn
 1996: Andrew Tesorière

Ambassador Extraordinary and Plenipotentiary
1996–1998: Andrew Tesorière
1998–1999: Stephen Nash
1999–2001: Peter January
2001–2003: David Landsman
2003–2006: Richard Jones
2006–2009: Fraser Wilson
2009–2012: Fiona McIlwham
2012–2016: Nicholas Cannon
2016–2021: Duncan Norman

2021-Present: Alastair King-Smith

References

External links
UK and Albania, gov.uk
Hanson, Joanna, Full history of the British Presence in Albania, Foreign Office, 10 October 2002 (via archive.org)

Albania
 
United Kingdom Ambassadors
United Kingdom